Eucalyptus siderophloia, commonly known as the northern grey ironbark, is a medium-sized to tall ironbark tree that is endemic to south eastern Australia. It has hard, dark, furrowed bark, lance-shaped to curved adult leaves, flower buds in groups of seven, white flowers and cup-shaped or conical fruit.

Description
It has hard, rough, furrowed grey or black bark on the trunk and branches, sometimes smooth on the thinner branches. Flowering mainly occurs from September to January and the flowers are white.

Taxonomy and naming
Eucalyptus siderophloia was first formally described in 1867 by George Bentham in Flora Australiensis. Terri-barri is an Aboriginal word from the Sydney region. The specific epithet (siderophloia) is derived from Greek words meaning "iron" and "bark".

Distribution and habitat
This ironbark grows in forests on the coast and adjacent foothills in soils of reasonable fertility, from about Maryborough and Springsure in Queensland to near Sydney in New South Wales.

Uses
The sapwood is usually resistant to the lyctus borer. Not an easy timber to work, however it has a beautiful appearance similar to some rainforest species. Uses include flooring and decking, shipbuilding, poles, construction, railway sleepers and heavy engineering.

References

siderophloia
Myrtales of Australia
Flora of New South Wales
Flora of Queensland
Trees of Australia
Plants described in 1867